Ellis Bagley Stouffer (7 November 1884, Melbourne, Iowa  – 24 November 1965, Lawrence, Kansas) was an American mathematician specializing in projective differential geometry.

Biography
Stouffer received bachelor's and master's degrees from Drake University in Des Moines, Iowa. In 1911 he received a Ph.D. in mathematics from the University of Illinois Urbana-Champaign under Ernest Julius Wilczynski with thesis Invariants of Linear Differential Equations, with Applications to Ruled Surfaces in Five-Dimensional Space.

Stouffer became at the University of Kansas in 1914 assistant professor, in 1917 associate professor and in 1921 full professor. In 1922 he also became dean of the Graduate School. In 1946–1951 he was dean of the University during its academic expansion program after World War II. He retired as dean in 1951 but continued teaching until 1955.

He was awarded a Guggenheim Fellowship for the academic year 1926–1927. In 1928 he was an invited speaker at the International Congress of Mathematicians in Bologna.

Upon his death he was survived by a wife and daughter. His doctoral students include Wealthy Babcock. At the University of Kansas, the E. B. Stouffer Professorship of Mathematics was established in his honor.

Selected publications

with Ernest P. Lane:

References

1884 births
1965 deaths
People from Marshall County, Iowa
20th-century American mathematicians
Drake University alumni
University of Illinois Urbana-Champaign alumni
University of Kansas faculty